Orchidarium may refer to:
 A vivarium, specifically for the cultivation of orchids
 An area in a park or botanical garden dedicated to orchids

Orchid cultivation